Two Mexican stations bear the callsign XHSFT, both in San Fernando, Tamaulipas:

XHSFT-FM 103.7, defunct radio station
XHSFT-TDT channel 25, transmitter for Canal de las Estrellas